The Canadian Cattlemen's Association is an advocacy group promoting the interests of cow-calf producers, feedlots, and packers in the Canadian beef industry.  Throughout its history, the CCA has worked to improve market access for Canadian beef producers and in lobbying efforts with the Canadian government.

Structure
The CCA is made up of eight provincial members' organizations that provide the 27 members of the board of directors.  The eight provincial member organizations include B.C. Cattlemen's Association, Alberta Beef Producers, Saskatchewan Cattlemen's Association, Manitoba Beef Producers, Beef Farmers of Ontario, New Brunswick Cattle Producers, Nova Scotia Cattle Producers and Prince Edward Island Cattle Producers.

Lobby group
According to the Federal lobbyist registry, from January to September 2012, the Canadian Cattlemen's Association had 113 contacts with federal officials to discuss issues such as financial loan guarantees, imports of non-NAFTA beef and veal, animal health, and livestock carcass grading regulations, making it the lobby group with the third most contacts that year.

See also 
 National Cattlemen's Beef Association

References

External links
 The Canadian Cattlemen's Association
 The Canadian Cattlemen's Association 2014 Annual Report

Canadian lobbyists
Lobbying in Canada
Lobbying organizations in Canada
Food industry trade groups
Beef
Trade associations based in Canada
Cattle